Casimir of Pomerania may refer to:
Casimir I, Duke of Pomerania-Demmin
Casimir II, Duke of Pomerania-Demmin
Casimir III, Duke of Pomerania-Stettin
Casimir IV, Duke of Pomerania-Stolp